Hounds is a New Zealand television comedy series, written, produced and directed by The Down Low Concept.

Set in Auckland, New Zealand it centres on a self-centred lawyer, Will Carrington (Toby Sharpe), and the unusual family unit he is thrust into following the death of his father David, (Roy Billing). Will inherits half a stately house, half a racing greyhound with its live in trainer, Marty (Mick Innes), and guardianship of his estranged half-sister Lily (Susana Tang).

The series follows Will's transition from a soulless city slicker as he deals with his new family that he has never met, and the low rent surroundings of the Greyhound community. Backed with a strong supporting cast of comic actors, including Will's best friend, the arrogant and self-serving Lance (Josh Thomson) and shallow ditsy girlfriend Amber (Catherine Waller), Hounds also featured well known comics Guy Williams and Rhys Mathewson in minor roles, and veteran New Zealand actors Derek Payne, Steven Ure and David Weatherley

The series is one of New Zealand's most critically acclaimed comedies ever produced.

Controversy 
Before the series even aired it courted controversy due to the name of the racing greyhound Lundybainwatson when lawyer Joe Karam complained to the network citing bad taste and potentially a defamation lawsuit. Writers and producers The Down Low Concept had named the dog after three infamous and controversial New Zealand murder cases, due to the character of Will's father, and the original owner of the dog being a high court judge. The dog's name referred to convicted multiple murderers Mark Lundy, Scott Watson and David Bain. Bain was later acquitted after spending 13 years in jail following numerous appeals from Karam resulting in his eventual release from prison in 2009.

The unintentional publicity stunt caused a minor stir  when the producers of the show called for suggestions on the Hounds Facebook page. At the behest of the network the production company re-shot and re-recorded audio in the few scenes where the dog's name was mentioned, renaming the dog Lundydixonwatson. Dixon referred to another controversial New Zealand murderer, Antonie Dixon.

Awards

New Zealand Television Awards

New York Festivals

Script Writer Awards New Zealand (SWANZ)

TV Guide Best On The Box Awards 

Show creators The Down Low Concept were also awarded the Worst Onscreen Death 2013 prize for the death of the dog Lundydixonwatson from television critic Chris Philpott, calling the moment "Laugh-out-loud funny, but totally awkward".

This was the second year in a row for the production company winning in the comedy category at the New Zealand Television Awards, having won the previous year with their comedy gameshow, 7 Days.

Reception 
"Is Hounds the best Kiwi comedy ever? Yes." Chris Philpott, Stuff.co.nz

"Hounds, I believe, is the best Kiwi comedy show ever made...  at one point during the show's six unmissable episodes I found myself doing just that, snot smeared on the carpet, begging, pleading with them to dial back the laughs just for a bit so I could clean up the mess." Chris Schulz, The New Zealand Herald

"Think Vigil with a post modern nod to Fred Dagg humour". Jane Bowron, The Dominion Post

"This isn't the laugh out loud, neon-lit, canned-laughter comedy we get from so many American imports. It's original, understated and thoroughly well written." Pattie Pegler, Stuff.co.nz

"It is very sweet, completely silly, and amazingly rude". Michele Hewitson, The New Zealand Herald

“Like mould on a bathmat in an Auckland winter, it grows on you. Like the culture from which it springs, it’s effortlessly, compulsively, authentically weird.” Diana Wichtel, The Listener

"The Down Low Concept took their show to an unfamiliar setting, loaded the cast with unfamiliar (but talented) faces, and stocked the script with some of the cleverest dialogue you'll find in any comedy, let alone a locally produced one". Chris Philpott, Stuff.co.nz

"The Down Low Concept are as close to a Kiwi comedy hit factory as currently exists". Lee Henaghan, The Nelson Mail

"When I watched the whole series the first time it was down to being diligent; the second time was to make absolutely sure it's as good as I thought it was; the third and every subsequent time (and there will be many, I'm sure) will be for the sheer, absolute joy of it" Nick Grant, Herald on Sunday

Episodes

References

External links 
 Official Website TV3 (New Zealand)
 
 The Down Low Concept Production Company

2010s New Zealand television series
2012 New Zealand television series debuts
2012 New Zealand television series endings
English-language television shows
New Zealand comedy television series
Television shows funded by NZ on Air
Television shows set in Auckland
Three (TV channel) original programming